Norumbega, or Nurembega, is a legendary settlement in northeastern North America which was featured on many early maps from the 16th century until European colonization of the region.  It was alleged that the houses had pillars of gold and the inhabitants carried quarts of pearls on their heads.

The word "Norumbega" was originally spelled Oranbega in Giovanni da Verrazzano's 1529 map of America, and the word is believed to derive from one of the Algonquian languages spoken in New England. It may mean "quiet place between the rapids" or "quiet stretch of water".  In 1542, Jean Allefonsce reported that he had coasted south from Newfoundland and had discovered a great river. It often appeared on subsequent European maps of North America, lying south of Acadia in what is now New England. 

The town of Bangor, Maine, commemorated the legend during the nineteenth century, naming their municipal hall "Norumbega Hall".  In 1886, inventor Joseph Barker Stearns built a mansion named "Norumbega Castle", which still stands on US Route 1 in Camden, Maine, overlooking Penobscot Bay. During the late 19th century, Eben Norton Horsford associated the name and legend of Norumbega with supposed Norse settlements on the Charles River, and built the Norumbega Tower at the confluence of Stony Brook and the Charles River in Weston, Massachusetts, where he claimed Fort Norumbega was located. In honor of Horsford's generous donations to Wellesley College, a building named Norumbega Hall was dedicated in 1886 and celebrated in a poem by John Greenleaf Whittier. Presently, the myth is commemorated by such place names as Norumbega Mountain (formerly Brown Mountain) in Acadia National Park.

References

Further reading
DeCosta, B.F. 1890. Ancient Norumbega, or the voyages of Simon Ferdinando and John Walker to the Penobscot River, 1579-1580. Joel Munsell's Sons, Albany, NY
 R. H. Ramsay, 1972. No Longer on the Map, Viking Books
Baker, Emerson W., Churchill, Edwin A., D'Abate, Richard S., Jones, Kristine L., Konrad, Victor A. and Prins, Harald E.L., editors, 1994. American beginnings: Exploration, culture, and cartography in the land of Norumbega (University of Nebraska Press)
 Reider T, Sherwin  The Viking and The Red Man 

Mythological populated places
Canadian mythology
Pseudohistory
Norse colonization of North America
Pre-Columbian trans-oceanic contact